Cristovão da Silva Bastos Filho (born December 3, 1946) is a Brazilian songwriter, pianist and arranger. He has performed and composed for artists including Maria Bethânia, Milton Nascimento, Gal Costa, Ivan Lins, Barbra Streisand, Dionne Warwick and Paulinho da Viola. Bastos has been nominated for a Latin Grammy and has won 6 Prêmio da Música Brasileira.

Work 
Bastos has been active as a songwriter, arranger and pianist since the 1970s. In 1992, he released "Bons Encontros", his first album as a primary artist along with Marco Pereira. In 1996, he released his first solo album, "Avenida Brasil".

Bastos was the pianist and arranger for Dionne Warwick's 1994 album "Aquarela do Brasil", a collection of Brazilian jazz and pop standards.

Barbra Streisand's 1999 song "Let's Start Right Now" is set to the music of "Raios de Luz", written by Bastos and Abel Silva.

In 2006, Bastos composed the soundtrack for the film “Zuzu Angel”, directed by Sérgio Rezende.

Awards and honors 
Bastos' album "Cristovão Bastos e Rogério Caetano" was nominated for the Latin Grammy Award for Best Instrumental Album at the 22nd Annual Latin Grammy Awards.

Together with Marco Pereira, Bastos won the 1994 Prêmio da Música Brasileira (also known as the Prêmio Sharp) for Best Instrumental Album for their album "Bons Encontros". His song "Tua Cantiga", co-written and performed by Chico Buarque, was awarded the 2018 Prêmio da Música Brasileira for Best Song.

As arranger, Bastos received Sharp prizes for his work with Paulinho da Viola (1990), Parceria (1995), Disfarça e Chora (1996), and Tantos Caminhos (1997).

Personal life 
Bastos was married to Amelia Rabello.

Discography 
 Bons Encontros (1992)
 Avenida Brasil (1996)
 Interpreta Tom Jobim (1999)
 Cristovão Bastos e Rogério Caetano (2020)

References 

Brazilian composers
Male jazz musicians
Male pianists
Brazilian record producers
Brazilian jazz pianists
20th-century composers
Latin jazz pianists
Música Popular Brasileira pianists
Musicians from Rio de Janeiro (city)
Latin music songwriters
1946 births
Living people